The Dream of Aeneas is an oil on canvas painting by Italian artist Salvator Rosa, executed c. 1660-1665. Done in oil on canvas, the work depicts a scene from the Roman poet Virgil's Aeneid in which an embodiment of the Tiber river speaks to the Trojan hero Aeneas. The work is in the collection of the Metropolitan Museum of Art, in New York.

References

Paintings by Salvator Rosa
1660s paintings
Paintings in the collection of the Metropolitan Museum of Art
Paintings depicting Roman myths
Paintings based on the Aeneid